This article lists notable alumni of the California Polytechnic State University in San Luis Obispo.

Arts and media

Pedro Armendáriz (1912–1963), character actor, award-winning leading man in dozens of films from the Golden Age of Mexican cinema
Michael Berryman (born 1948), actor
Dave Carnie (born 1969), writer, artist, former editor of Big Brother Magazine
Irene Chan (born 1965), artist
Margo Chase (1958–2017), graphic designer
Luke Chueh contemporary artist
Michelle Franzen (born 1968), television and radio journalist for NBC News and ABC News
Danny Gans (1956–2009), Las Vegas entertainer
Nathan L. Good (born 1954), architect
Paula Huston (born 1952), author
Cam Inman, San Francisco 49ers reporter for Bay Area News Group
John Madden (1936-2021), Pro Football Hall of Fame broadcaster, head coach, and player
Cassie McFarland (born 1985), artist, designed the obverse of the 2014 National Baseball Hall of Fame commemorative coin
Andy Paiko (born 1977), contemporary glass artist
George Ramos (1947–2011), three-time Pulitzer Prize-winning journalist
Suzanne Roberts (born 1970), poet, travel writer, and photographer
M. Ward (born 1973), folk musician, singer-songwriter and guitarist
"Weird Al" Yankovic (born 1959), rock parodist and entertainer
Zach Shallcross (born 1996), reality television personality, The Bachelor
Steven Ford (born 1956),  is an American actor, and son of former U.S. President Gerald Ford and former First Lady Betty Ford.

Business
James Griffin Boswell, Chairman of the board, J.G. Boswell Company
Jamie Evans, cannabis professional
Noel Lee, President and founder, Monster Cable
Bob Mazzuca (B.S. History, 1970), Chief Scout Executive of Boy Scouts of America
Farzad Nazem (B.S. Computer Science, 1981), former Chief Technology Officer of Yahoo!
Peter Oppenheimer (B.S. Ag Business, 1985), former Chief Financial Officer of Apple Computer
William H. Swanson (B.S. Industrial Engineering, 1973) (born 1950), Chairman and CEO of Raytheon

Politics and government
Tom Berryhill, Stanislaus County Supervisor, former California State Senator
Warren Church, Monterey County Board of Supervisors
Jeff Denham, former United States Representative for California's 10th congressional district
Dennis Hollingsworth (born 1967), former California State Senator
Doug LaMalfa, United States Representative for California's 1st congressional district
Abel Maldonado (born 1967), 47th Lieutenant Governor of California
Bruce McPherson (born 1944), 30th California Secretary of State
Mohammadreza Nematzadeh, Minister of Labour and Minister of Industry and Mine in the Islamic Republic of Iran
George Radanovich, former United States Representative for California's 19th congressional district
Robert C. Tapella, 25th Public Printer of the United States
Devin Nunes,former United States Representative for California's 22nd Congressional District

Science and technology
Michael Alsbury, commercial astronaut, Virgin Galactic test pilot; killed in the 2014 Virgin Galactic crash
Greg Chamitoff (born 1962), astronaut
Robert L. Gibson (born 1946), astronaut
David Haussler, professor at University of California, Santa Cruz
David C. La Rue, Ph.D., Animal Scientist (Animal Science 1981), applied biochemist, amino acid and trace mineral researcher for livestock, generational cattle rancher and sustainable ranching and farming consultant. 
Mark Lucovsky, software architect and a part of the team that designed Windows NT
Kristen Maitland, optical scientist and Fellow of SPIE
Alison Murray, biochemist and Antarctic researcher
Aaron Peckham, owner and creator of UrbanDictionary
Burt Rutan (born 1943), designer of SpaceShipOne and Rutan Voyager
Peter Siebold, commercial astronaut, Virgin Galactic Test Pilot 
Frederick W. Sturckow (born 1961), astronaut
Tory Bruno, rocket scientist and CEO of United Launch Alliance
Victor J. Glover, (born 1976), astronaut

Athletics

Baseball
Justin Bruihl (born 1997), MLB pitcher
Kevin Correia (born 1980), MLB pitcher
Casey Fien (born 1983), MLB pitcher
Mitch Haniger (born 1990), MLB outfielder for the San Francisco Giants
Mike Krukow (born 1952), former MLB pitcher and current broadcast announcer
Bud Norris (born 1985), MLB pitcher
Garrett Olson (born 1983), former MLB pitcher
John Orton (born 1965), former MLB catcher
Ozzie Smith (born 1954), MLB Hall of Fame shortstop
Dean Treanor (born 1947), manager of the Indianapolis Indians 
Joey Wagman (born 1991), pitcher

Basketball
Ben Eisenhardt (born 1990), American-Israeli professional basketball player in the Israeli Basketball Premier League
David Nwaba (born 1993), NBA player for the Chicago Bulls
Joe Prunty (born 1969), NBA assistant coach for the Milwaukee Bucks

Football
Marijon Ancich, high school football coach with the most wins in California history
Ramses Barden (born 1986), former NFL wide receiver
Jordan Beck (born 1983), NFL linebacker
Alex Bravo (born 1930), former NFL defensive back
Courtney Brown (born 1984), former NFL defensive back
Sal Cesario (born 1963), former NFL offensive guard
Jim Criner (born 1940), college football head coach
Nick Dzubnar (born 1991), linebacker for San Diego Chargers
Chris Gocong (born 1983), NFL linebacker
Asa Jackson (born 1989), NFL cornerback
Mel Kaufman (1958–2009), former NFL linebacker Washington Redskins, 1981–1988
John Madden (1936-2021), Pro Football Hall of Fame broadcaster, head coach, and player
Dana Nafziger (born 1953), NFL player
Ted Tollner (born 1940), former NFL coach
Cecil Turner (born 1944), former NFL WR/KR Chicago Bears, 1968–1973, selected to 1971 NFL Pro Bowl
Fred Whittingham (born 1939), former NFL linebacker and coach

Other athletes
Sharon Day (born 1985), former NCAA Women's heptathlon champion, 2011 USA outdoor national champion
Dean Karnazes, Ultramarathoner
Karen Kraft, U.S. silver medalist in coxless pair rowing at the 1996 Summer Olympics and a bronze medalist in coxless pairs at the 2000 Summer Olympics
Gene Lenz, All-American college swimmer, 1960 Summer Olympics finalist in the 400-meter freestyle 
Chuck Liddell (born 1969), wrestler; retired mixed martial artist, former UFC Light Heavyweight Champion, and UFC Hall of Fame member
Gan McGee, professional MMA fighter
Chad Mendes (born 1985), 2008 NCAA wrestling runner-up at 141 lb, professional MMA fighter, UFC featherweight contender
Gina Miles, U.S. silver medalist in individual eventing at the 2008 Summer Olympics
Anton Peterlin (born 1987), soccer player
Borislav Novachkov, Olympic wrestler
Victor Plata (born 1973), USA Olympian in the triathlon
Loren Roberts (born 1955), professional golfer on the PGA Tour
Sean Johnston (rally driver)  (born 1990), American World Rally Championship driver 
Monty Roberts (born 1935), professional horse trainer, former rodeo rider, and author
Horton "Cotton" Rosser (1928-2022), 1951 All-Around National Champion, College National Finals Rodeo, Pro Rodeo Hall of Fame, "King of the Cowboys", Owner of Flying U Rodeo Company, Cal Poly honorary Doctorate, honoree of the Cotton Rosser Rodeo Complex at Cal Poly.
Stephanie Brown Trafton (born 1979), U.S. gold medalist in discus throw at the 2008 Summer Olympics
Maggie Vessey (born 1981), professional 800-meter runner
Barton Williams (born 1956), NCAA All-American 400m-hurdler
Kip Colvey (born 1994), professional soccer player for the Colorado Rapids in Major League Soccer; represents his home country New Zealand in International "FIFA" tournaments

Others 
 Scott C. Black (born 1952), Lieutenant General (United States Army, Retired), 37th Judge Advocate General of the United States Army. He was the first Lieutenant General to hold that position
 Maya Higa (born 1998), conservationist, falconer, wildlife rehabilitator, and Twitch streamer. 
 Scott Peterson, convicted murderer 
 Gilbert H. Stork, president of Cuesta College
 Laci Peterson (born 1975)
 Kristin Smart (born 1977)
 Wil Dasovich, Filipino American YouTube personality

Notes

External links
 http://www.calpoly.edu/aboutcp.html#_national

Cal Poly at San Luis Obispo alumni